Bartlett-Rockhill House, also known as the Sea Captain's House, is located in the village of Tuckerton Seaport on Main Street in Tuckerton in Ocean County, New Jersey near Baymen's Museum.

The house was constructed circa 1855 for Edmund Bartlett and was later owned by the sea captain, Capt. Zebedee W. Rockhill. It was purchased by Bartlett's nephew,  J. Henry Bartlett's, in 1910, who lived there until 1945. The house combines of late Federal and early Victorian styles, with  additions and alterations made to the house up until the 1930s. Now owned by the museum, the house is used for temporary storage, occasional events Victorian-era interpretation.

The building was listed as Bartlett-Rockhill-Bartlett House the on the New Jersey Register of Historic Places on December 12, 2012 and the National Register of Historic Places on January 20, 2012.

See also
Andrews-Barlett Homestead
National Register of Historic Places listings in Ocean County, New Jersey
New Jersey Historic Trust

References

Houses in Ocean County, New Jersey
Museums in Ocean County, New Jersey
Tuckerton, New Jersey
National Register of Historic Places in Ocean County, New Jersey
Houses completed in 1855
Gothic Revival architecture in New Jersey